Batticaloa Tamil dialect is shared between Tamils, Moors, Veddhas and Portuguese Burghers in the Batticaloa-Amparai region of the Eastern Province, Sri Lanka. The Tamil dialect used by residents of the Trincomalee District has many similarities with the Jaffna Tamil dialect. According to Kamil Zvelebil a linguist, the Batticaloa Tamil dialect is the most literary like of all spoken dialects of Tamil, and it has preserved several antique features, and has remained more true to the literary norm than any other form of Tamil while developing a few striking innovations. Although Batticaloa Tamil has some very specific features of vocabulary, it is classified with other Sri Lankan Tamil dialects as it is related to them by characteristic traits of its phonology. It also maintains some words that are unique to present day. Also, the dialect has less influence of Sanskrit.

References

External links
 பழந்தமிழ் இலக்கியத்தில் மட்டக்களப்புத் தமிழ்
 மட்டக்களப்புப் பிரதேச வழக்குச் சொற்கள் சொற்றொடர்களினதும் பழ மொழிகளினதும் அகராதி
மட்டக்களப்புத் தமிழகம்

Ampara District society
Batticaloa District society
Languages of Sri Lanka
Sri Lankan Tamil society
Tamil dialects